Carlo Galimberti (2 August 1894 – 10 August 1939) was an Italian weightlifter who competed in the 1924 Summer Olympics, in the 1928 Summer Olympics and in the 1932 Summer Olympics.

Biography
Galimberti grew up in Rosario, Argentina, as son of Italian immigrants and came back to Milan, Italy, after the First World War. He won a gold medal in the middleweight class in 1924, a silver medal in the middleweight class in 1928 and another silver medal in the middleweight class in 1932.

See also
 Legends of Italian sport - Walk of Fame

References

External links
 
 

1894 births
1939 deaths
Italian male weightlifters
Olympic gold medalists for Italy
Olympic silver medalists for Italy
Olympic weightlifters of Italy
Weightlifters at the 1924 Summer Olympics
Weightlifters at the 1928 Summer Olympics
Weightlifters at the 1932 Summer Olympics
Weightlifters at the 1936 Summer Olympics
Olympic medalists in weightlifting
Medalists at the 1932 Summer Olympics
Medalists at the 1928 Summer Olympics
Medalists at the 1924 Summer Olympics
20th-century Italian people